The 1979 European Indoor Championships, also known as the Cologne Grand Prix, was a men's tennis tournament played on indoor carpet courts in Cologne, West Germany that was part of the 1979 Colgate-Palmolive Grand Prix circuit. It was the fourth edition of the tournament and was held from 29 October through 4 November 1979. First-seeded Gene Mayer won the singles title.

Finals

Singles
 Gene Mayer defeated  Wojciech Fibak 6–3, 3–6, 6–1
 It was Mayer's 1st singles title of the year and the 2nd of his career.

Doubles
 Gene Mayer /  Stan Smith defeated  Heinz Günthardt /  Pavel Složil 6–3, 6–4

References

External links
 ITF tournament edition details

Cologne Cup
Cologne Cup